5 afternoon is an Iranian movie, directed by Mehran Modiri. This movie sold more than $175,000 on the first day, which was a record for Iranian movies.

Plot
Mehrdad Parham is a lawyer who lives alone in the north of Tehran. He has to go to the bank branch at 5 o'clock to pay the bank installment to save his house from being confiscated by the bank but...

Cast 

 Siamak Ansari
 Amir Jafari
 Azadeh Samadi
 Rasoul Najafian
 Mehran Modiri

References

External links
 

Iranian comedy films
Persian-language films